The Rick and Morty Soundtrack is the soundtrack to American adult animated science fiction sitcom Rick and Morty. It was released on September 28, 2018 via Sub Pop.

The album is composed of 26 songs, 24 of which are from the first three seasons of the show, and 18 of which were composed by Ryan Elder specifically for the show. The album also includes songs by Chaos Chaos, Belly, Blonde Redhead and Mazzy Star, all of which have been featured in the show, as well as two new tunes from Chad VanGaalen and clipping. inspired by the show.

The album debuted at the top of the Billboard Vinyl Albums chart, at No. 2 on the Soundtracks chart, at No. 4 on the Independent Albums chart, at No. 19 on the Top Internet chart, at No. 22 on the Album Sales chart, and at No. 27 on the Top Digital chart.

Track listing

Personnel
Bridgette Kimbrough – creative producer
Brandon Lively – creative director
Trey Wadsworth – art direction, design
Jeff Kleinsmith – art direction
Robert Beatty – artwork
Will Sweeney – artwork
Saiman Chow – artwork
Skinner – artwork
Chris "CN" Noel – lacquer

Charts

References

External links

2018 soundtrack albums
Sub Pop soundtracks
Adult Swim soundtracks